Krishna Chandra Nepali was sworn in as Chief Minister of Gandaki Province on 12 June 2021. This government was supported by CPN(Maoist-Centre), NSP while Rastriya Janamorcha supported without joining the government.

Chief Minister & Cabinet Ministers

Member by party

See also 
 Rajendra Kumar Rai cabinet
 Lalbabu Raut cabinet
  Rajendra Prasad Pandey cabinet
 Kul Prasad KC cabinet
 Jeevan Bahadur Shahi cabinet
 Trilochan Bhatta cabinet

References

External links
 Gandaki Province official website
 Cabinet of Gandaki Province

Government of Gandaki Province
Provincial cabinets of Nepal
2021 establishments in Nepal
2023 disestablishments in Nepal